West Dublin/Pleasanton is a Bay Area Rapid Transit (BART) station on the border of Dublin and Pleasanton in California, located in the median of I-580. It opened as an infill station on the Blue Line on February 19, 2011 — fourteen years after the rest of the line.

The station has a single island platform located at the level of the highway travel lanes. The fare mezzanine is above the platform and tracks. Pedestrian bridges on both sides of the station connect it to a pair of parking garages and surrounding development.

History

Original plans in the late 1980s called for a station in West Dublin, with an East Dublin station near the Hacienda Business Park to be added later; however, by the early 1990s the order was reversed, and only Dublin/Pleasanton station opened in 1997. BART began negotiating in April 1998 with LaSalle Partners to construct the West Dublin/Pleasanton station with private funding, and an agreement was signed the next year.

Groundbreaking for the station was held on September 29, 2006. The station was originally scheduled to be complete in 2009, but it was delayed due to structural issues with the pedestrian bridges. The $106 million station, which was funded largely by private money and by proceeds of planned transit-oriented development (TOD) on adjacent BART-owned property, opened on February 19, 2011.

Bus connections
Dublin/Pleasanton station is the primary bus terminal for the region; West Dublin/Pleasanton is only served by three WHEELS routes. Route 30R stops at the north parking garage; routes 3 and 53 stop on Stoneridge Mall Road near the south parking garage.

References

External links

BART - West Dublin/Pleasanton

Bay Area Rapid Transit stations in Alameda County, California
Stations on the Blue Line (BART)
Dublin, California
Pleasanton, California
Amador Valley
Railway stations in the United States opened in 2011